Cottbus-Merzdorf station is a railway station in the Merzdorf district in the town of Cottbus, located in Brandenburg, Germany.

References

External links

Railway stations in Brandenburg
Buildings and structures in Cottbus